Creery is a surname. Notable people with the surname include:

Andrew McCreight Creery (1863–1942), Irish-born financial, real estate, and insurance agent and political figure in Canada
Leslie Creery (1783–1849), Anglican priest in Ireland

See also
Creary